Mohyliv-Podilskyi Raion is one of the six regions of Vinnytsia Oblast, located in southwestern Ukraine. The administrative center of the raion is the city of Mohyliv-Podilskyi. Population: 

On 18 July 2020, as part of the administrative reform of Ukraine, the number of raions of Vinnytsia Oblast was reduced to six, and the area of Mohyliv-Podilskyi Raion was significantly expanded.  The January 2020 estimate of the raion population was

People from Mohyliv-Podilskyi Raion
 Serhiy Budza
 Volodymyr Didushytsky
 Raya Dunayevskaya
 Oleksander Lototsky

References

 
Raions of Vinnytsia Oblast
1925 establishments in Ukraine